The whipping frog is a genus of frogs in the family Rhacophoridae.

Whipping frog may also refer to:

 Blanford's whipping frog, a frog found in China, Laos, Burma, and Vietnam
 Chinese whipping frog, a frog endemic to China
 Günther's whipping frog, a frog endemic to Sri Lanka
 Southern whipping frog, a frog endemic to Sri Lanka

Animal common name disambiguation pages